The 1908-09 French Rugby Union Championship of first division was won by FC Lyon that beat Stade Bordelais.

Contest 
The France national team, participated for the first time to the "Five Nations Championship". The tournament was won by England, France was last.

Semifinals

Final 

The Welsh coach of SBUC, Priest, was suspended by USFA having broken the rules about amateurism (it received a salary from club) but won it process and could continued to coach the team.

External links
Compte rendu de la finale de 1910, sur lnr.fr

France
1910
Championship